Vernon S. Bennett (January 1, 1867 – October 26, 1944) was an American college football coach. He served as the head football at Michigan State Normal School—now known as Eastern Michigan University—one season, in 1894, and compiling a record of 5–2.

Early years
Bennett was born in Prattsburgh, New York to "Mr. and Mrs. E.N. Bennett". At the birth of his younger brother Clare in 1871, the family resided in Lapeer, Michigan. He enrolled at Michigan State Normal School in 1891, and while in school he served as president of the Normal Athletic Association, and as editor of the Atheneum Society. In 1892, he served as an enrolling and engrossing clerk for the Michigan House of Representatives. As a senior, he gave a commencement oration on international law, which is recorded as being "especially fine."

Coaching career
Bennett was the fourth head football coach at Michigan State Normal School—now known as Eastern Michigan University—in Ypsilanti, Michigan, serving for one season, in 1894, and compiling a record of 5–2.

Later life
Following his time as the football coach, Bennett resided in Fenton, Michigan with his family, and later in New Orleans. He died there in 1944.

Head coaching record

References

1867 births
1944 deaths
Eastern Michigan Eagles football coaches
People from Prattsburgh, New York
People from Lapeer, Michigan
People from Fenton, Michigan
Sportspeople from Metro Detroit